This is a list of Chinese football transfers for the 2010 season winter transfer window. Only moves from Super League and League One are listed. The transfer window opened from January 1 to March 10.

Super League

Beijing Guoan

In:

 

Out:

Changchun Yatai

In:

 (loan return)

Out:

Changsha Ginde

In:

Out:

Chongqing Lifan

In:

Out:

Dalian Shide

In:

 
 

Out:

Hangzhou Greentown

In:

 
 
 

Out:

Henan Jianye

In:

 
 

 
 (loan)

Out:

Jiangsu Sainty

In:

Out:

Liaoning Whowin

In:

Out:

Nanchang Hengyuan

In:

Out:

Qingdao Jonoon

In:

 
 
 
 

Out:

Shaanxi Baorong Chanba

In:

 (loan)
 
 

Out:

Shandong Luneng

In:

 (loan return)

 

Out:

Shanghai Shenhua

In:

 
 

 
 

Out:

Shenzhen Ruby

In:

 
 
 
 
 
 
 
 

 
 

Out:

Tianjin Teda

In:

 

 (loan return)
 
 

Out:

League One

Anhui Jiufang

In:

Out:

Beijing Baxy&Shengshi

In:

 

Out:

Beijing Technology

In:

Out:

Chengdu Blades

In:

  

Out:

Guangdong Sunray Cave

In:

Out:

Guangzhou GAC

In:

 

Out:

Hunan Billows

In:

Out:

Hubei Luyin

In:

 (loan return)
 
 
 
 
 

 

Out:

Nanjing Yoyo

In:

Out:

Shanghai Zobon

In:

	

Out:

Shanghai East Asia

In:

Out:

Shenyang Dongjin

In:

Out:

Yanbian

In:

Out:

References

China
2009-10